Tag Team Wrestling, known as  in Japan, is a wrestling video game developed by Technōs Japan and released for arcades in 1983. The arcade version was published by Data East both in Japan and North America, but only the North American version mentions the name of Data East in-game. It was later ported in the mid-1980s to computers and the Famicom/NES.

Gameplay
In the original game, the player controls a professional wrestling tag-team, two identical wrestlers with black hair, orange trunks and brown boots named Sunny and Terry (Jocko and Spike in the U.S. version) who must defeat a couple of masked wrestlers known as the Heel Team (Mad Maulers in the U.S. version): one of them a skinny wrestler with an orange mask and boots and white trunks, the other a fat wrestler in a black mask and tights with white boots. The player's team must continually beat the Heel Team in order to win trophies and maintain gameplay. After the tenth match, the player's team is designated the world champions and must keep playing in order to maintain their title. In the event of the Heel Team winning or a tying a match, the game is over.

The player is provided with a joystick and two buttons: a "select" button and an "action/pin" button. The player uses the joystick to move Sunny or Terry around the ring, where they must make contact with the member of the Heel Team (in the first match, the skinny wrestler from the Heel Team starts, then the fat one in the second, and it continues that way from there on in, as does with the player's wrestlers). Upon making contact with the opposing wrestler, the two wrestlers will immediately grapple. The player then releases the opposing wrestler by pulling away, then grappling again, waiting for the "Action" command, which will flash onscreen. Due to being one of the earliest professional wrestling video games, Tag Team Wrestling has a limited number of wrestling moves and characters. Moves and counters are performed through the use of a real-time, menu-based action-reaction fighting module. After engaging in a grapple and the "Action" command flashes, players quickly scroll through a menu and choose a technique to perform.

This means that the player has an advantage over the opponent, and must utilize the "select" button to go over the list of wrestling moves provided, and then the "action" button to choose the desired move. The player has 3 seconds to choose the desired move, or else the opposing wrestler will gain an advantage over the player's wrestler and execute their own move. If the Heel Team wrestler in the ring has not been grappled with in a while, they will enter their "red" mode: The wrestler will turn all red and, traveling at twice the normal speed, attack the player's wrestler in the ring with an immediate advantage. In this situation, the player can only tag out with the "Action" button (if the wrestler is weakened and the tagged-in wrestler is strong enough to withstand the attack) or keep away from the Heel Team wrestler until their "red" phase runs out.

The wrestling moves the player may execute (when the "Action" command flashes) consist of:

The Nutter - a headlock (200* - 300 points), 
The Straight Jab, 
The Karate Chop (300* points),
The Kick (200* - 300 points),
The Rabbit Killer - done by trapping the opponent's head between the wrestler's legs (800 - 900* points),  
The Body Slam (500 - 700* points),
The Drop Kick - done by flinging the opponent against the ring ropes, the kicking them when they return (500 - 700* points), 
The Pile-driver* (600 points),
The Brain Buster* (800 points),
The W. Lariat* - also known as the "Clothes Line" (1,000 points), 
The Rear Drop* (600 points) - if executed when the opponent (the skinny Heel Team wrestler) is considerably weakened, it will count as a pin. 
The Cobra Twist* - also known as the "Abominable Stretch", is a submission move: if executed on the skinny Heel Team wrestler after he has lost most of his energy, the wrestler will submit (the words "Give Up!" will flash on screen) and the player will win the match. If executed while the skinny wrestler is too strong, the fat Heel Team wrestler will interfere, running into the ring and pounding the player's wrestler until he releases his opponent. This is the only case in which one wrestler will interfere for another.

All of these wrestling moves can be executed on the skinny Heel Team wrestler. The ones marked with an asterisk (*) cannot be used against the fat Heel Team wrestler. If the player attempts any of these moves on him, the fat wrestler will simply get out of it and nail the player's wrestler with his own move.

Once a wrestler is considerably weakened (usually via 3 or more major wrestling moves), they will try to tag out with their tag team partner, who will enter the ring at full strength. While being tagged-out, the wrestler will slowly begin recharging his energy. If a weakened wrestler isn't able to tag out in time and has lost too much energy, they will fall over, leaving them vulnerable to a pin (executable by the "Action/Pin" button). If a wrestler still has strength left, they will throw the pinning opponent off them, the player executing this move by shaking the joystick and hitting the "Action" button.

If a wrestler executes a move on another wrestler too close to the ring ropes, they may end up knocking their opponent, or themselves, out of the ring entirely. In this situation, the on-screen scene will change from an upper-view of the ring to a side-view of it. The wrestler who has been knocked out has a count of 20 to re-enter the ring to avoid being counted out. Often, in the situation where the player's wrestler has been knocked out of the ring, the opposing wrestler will follow them in order to execute one of the 4 moves allotted in the given situation. The first three moves are similar to The Straight Jab and The Karate Chop, the fourth, The Corner Bar, causes the wrestler executing the move to bash his opponent's head into the ring post. Like in inside the ring, the execution of these moves depend upon the "Action" command flashing to determine who has the advantage. The purposes of these moves is to hopefully keep the wrestler from re-entering the ring in time and be counted out. The instant a player's wrestler re-enters the ring, the on-screen scene immediately cuts back to the original one.

In some situations where the player's wrestler is knocked out of the ring, a spectator, an odd man in a turban sporting a goatee will come running out of the cheering crowd, attack the player's wrestler with some hard blows to the head, then storm off, thus making it take longer for the player's wrestler to re-enter the ring. Many have speculated that this person is most likely the Heel Team's manager, especially since the fat Heel Team's wrestler waves at the man whenever this occurs, although this has never been confirmed. The player's wrestler(s) have no defense against this character, except to hopefully re-enter the ring before the man reaches them.

Points are scored by the type of moves executed against one's opponent, as indicated above. Point scores with an asterisk (*) indicate the number of points scored if move is executed against the fat Heel Team wrestler. In addition, the player earns points by the amount of time it takes to end the match. For example, a match lasting only 30 – 40 seconds will give the player a bonus of 8,000 points, where a 40 - 50 second match will be worth 6,000 points, 50 second - a minute long match will be 5,000 points, and so forth. Sunny and Terry each earn their own individual scores for their time in the ring; these points are added together for the player's full score.

In the NES version, two professional wrestling tag-teams, the Strong Bads and the Ricky Fighters, battle against each other in tag-team action, or a single player competes in a series of tournaments to win ever larger trophies. Each of the four characters has a unique move that can only be used against one other rivalwrestler.

Reception 
In Japan, Game Machine listed Tag Team Wrestling on their January 15, 1984 issue as being the top-grossing new table arcade cabinet of the month. It later topped Japan's table arcade game charts in February 1984.

Ports and related releases
In 1984, the arcade game was ported to the Apple II, Commodore 64 and IBM PC in the United States by Quicksilver Software and published by Data East. U.S. Gold released Quicksilver's ports in Europe for the IBM PC in 1986 and the Commodore 64 in 1987.

Arguably, the most well known port is the Family Computer/Nintendo Entertainment System version created in 1986. The development of this port was a joint venture between Data East (for graphics & sound) and Sakata SAS (for programming). In North America, this  version was released on October the same year by Data East for the NES, keeping the Tag Team Wrestling title. This was Data East's first video game for the NES in America and one of the first third-party titles for the console in the United States.

See also

 Strong Bad, a fictional character inspired by the video game
 Mat Mania

Notes

References

External links
 Tag Team Wrestling at arcade-history
 

1983 video games
Apple II games
Arcade video games
Commodore 64 games
Data East arcade games
Data East video games
Multiplayer and single-player video games
Nintendo Entertainment System games
Quicksilver Software games
Tag team videogames
Technōs Japan games
Video games developed in Japan